Jonathan Walton (born 6 October 1990) is a British rower. He competed in the men's double sculls event at the 2016 Summer Olympics alongside John Collins.

Biography
Walton was born in Leicester and attended Groby Community College and Loughborough University.  He started rowing at Leicester Rowing Club where he was coached by Howard Marsh.  He represented Great Britain at junior and under-23 level before making his senior world championship debut in 2014. In 2016 he won his first World Cup medal, a silver at Poznan, before making his Olympic debut in Rio.  Along with John Collins he finished fifth in the final. He won a silver medal at the 2017 World Rowing Championships in Sarasota, Florida, as part of the quadruple sculls with Jack Beaumont, John Collins and Graeme Thomas.

References

External links
 

1990 births
Living people
British male rowers
Olympic rowers of Great Britain
Rowers at the 2016 Summer Olympics
Place of birth missing (living people)
World Rowing Championships medalists for Great Britain